This list of films produced in 1965 by the Bollywood film industry based in Mumbai includes both notable, and non-notable films.

At the 13th National Film Awards, the award for First, Second and Third Best Feature Film in Hindi went to Shaheed, Oonche Log and Guide respectively.

Top-Grossing Films
The top-grossing films at the Indian Box Office in 1965:

A-Z

References

External links
 Bollywood films of 1965 at the Internet Movie Database
 Indian Film Songs from the Year 1965 - A look back at 1965 with a special focus on Hindi film songs

1965
Bollywood
Films, Bollywood